Thomas Lutze (born 23 August 1969) is a German politician who represents The Left. Thomas Lutze has served as a member of the Bundestag from the state of Saarland since 2009.

Life 
Born in Elsterwerda, Brandenburg, Lutze grew up in Leipzig. In 1986, he completed his general secondary schooling, and three years later he completed his vocational training as a mechanical engineer in a foundry in Leipzig, which was linked to his A-levels. He then worked there as a repair fitter. In 1990 and 1991, he worked as an assembly fitter at a temporary employment agency. From 1991 to 1995 he studied design and production engineering at the University of Saarland. From 1995 to 2002, he was a regional office employee of the PDS parliamentary group in Saarbrücken. From 2003 to 2005, he retrained as an office administrator in a Saarbrücken furniture store. From 2005, he was a constituency employee of Oskar Lafontaine in Saarlouis. He became member of the bundestag after the 2009 German federal election. He is a member of the Committee for Economics and Energy. In his group he is spokesman for economic policy.

In March 2021, Lutze became part of a political scandal. Since September 2022 he is no longer the leader of The Left in the state of Saarland. He has been succeeded by Barbara Spaniol.

References

External links 

  
 Bundestag biography 

1969 births
Living people
Members of the Bundestag for Saarland
Members of the Bundestag 2021–2025
Members of the Bundestag 2017–2021
Members of the Bundestag 2013–2017
Members of the Bundestag 2009–2013
Members of the Bundestag for The Left